Mikko Juhani Ala-Leppilampi (24 July 1943 – 22 February 2005) was a Finnish middle-distance runner. He competed in the men's 3000 metres steeplechase at the 1972 Summer Olympics.

References

External links
 

1943 births
2005 deaths
Athletes (track and field) at the 1972 Summer Olympics
Finnish male middle-distance runners
Finnish male steeplechase runners
Olympic athletes of Finland